Violent Saturday is a 1955 American crime film directed by Richard Fleischer and starring Victor Mature, Richard Egan and Stephen McNally. Set in a fictional mining town in Arizona, the film depicts the planning of a bank robbery as the nexus in the personal lives of several townspeople.  (In the novel the film was adapted from, the setting was a small town in rural Alabama and there is no mine). 

In supporting roles are Virginia Leith, Sylvia Sidney and Ernest Borgnine. Violent Saturday was filmed in color and on location in Bisbee, Arizona.

Plot
Harper (Stephen McNally) is a bank robber posing as a traveling salesman. He arrives in town, soon to be joined by sadistic benzedrine addict Dill (Lee Marvin) and bookish Chapman (J. Carrol Naish).

Boyd Fairchild (Richard Egan) is manager of the local copper mine, troubled by his philandering wife (Margaret Hayes). He considers an affair with nurse Linda Sherman (Virginia Leith), though he truly loves his wife. His associate, Shelley Martin (Victor Mature), has a happy home life, but is embarrassed that his son believes that he is a coward because he did not serve in World War II.

Subplots involves a peeping-tom bank manager, Harry Reeves (Tommy Noonan), and a larcenous librarian, Elsie Braden (Sylvia Sidney). As the bank robbers carry out their plot, the separate character threads are drawn together. Violence erupts during the robbery. Fairchild's wife is slain and bank manager Reeves is wounded. Martin is held hostage on a farm with an Amish family. With the help of the father (Ernest Borgnine), he defeats the crooks in a savage gunfight. In the aftermath, Martin becomes a hero to his son, and Linda comforts Fairchild as he grieves for his wife.

Cast
 Victor Mature as Shelley Martin
 Richard Egan as Boyd Fairchild
 Stephen McNally as Harper
 Virginia Leith as Linda Sherman
 Tommy Noonan as Harry Reeves
 Lee Marvin as Dill
 Margaret Hayes as Mrs. Fairchild
 J. Carrol Naish as Chapman
 Sylvia Sidney as Elsie Braden
 Ernest Borgnine as Stadt
 Dorothy Patrick as Helen Martin
 Billy Chapin as Steve Martin
 Brad Dexter as Gil Clayton

Production
The film was based on the eponymous novel by William L Heath. In August 1954, studio chief Darryl F. Zanuck recommended that 20th Century Fox buy the screen rights prior to publication, and the studio paid a reported $30,000. Victor Mature had been feuding with 20th Century Fox but agreed to play the lead.

Filming began on December 6, 1954.

Critical reception
New York Times film critic Bosley Crowther disapproved of the violence in the film, calling it an "unedifying spectacle," while praising the performance of Lee Marvin as a hood "so icily evil he is funny." Borgnine's performance was panned by Crowther as "a joke."

Later reviewers have been favorable. In a 2008 article, the Village Voice called the film "the reigning king of Southwestern noir." The New York Press said "Violent Saturday seems rooted in tradition, but as an exciting pulp story with a profound center, it manages to break all the rules."  George Robinson in Cine-Journal wrote, "With the possible exception of The Narrow Margin, this is Richard Fleischer's best film. . . . Great, nasty fun." Michael Sragow of The New Yorker said, "Packed with twists and surprises. Marvin proves most unsettling as a hard guy who's always snorting from an inhaler (it's psychosomatic: he once had a wife with a perpetual cold). Mature, with his stricken manliness, reminds you of why James Agee thought he would be perfect as Diomed in Troilus and Cressida."

Richard Fleischer later wrote in his memoirs that "besides being the first CinemaScope picture ever made for under $1 million, it was a damn good movie. Darryl Zanuck, the studio's big boss, was very taken with it, and we – [producer] Buddy [Adler] and I – became sort of heroes. The direct result of this minor triumph was that I was given a five year directing contract and Buddy became Darryl's most favored producer."

See also
 List of American films of 1955

References

Solomon, Aubrey. Twentieth Century Fox: A Corporate and Financial History (The Scarecrow Filmmakers Series). Lanham, Maryland: Scarecrow Press, 1989. .

External links 
 
 
 
 Violent Saturday review at Film Noir of the Week
 New York Times review 
 Village Voice article 

1955 films
1955 crime drama films
1950s heist films
Amish in films
American crime drama films
American heist films
1950s English-language films
CinemaScope films
Color film noir
Films about bank robbery
Films based on American novels
Films directed by Richard Fleischer
Films scored by Hugo Friedhofer
Films set in Bisbee, Arizona
Films shot in Arizona
20th Century Fox films
1950s American films